The 1925–26 season was the 17th year of football played by Dundee United, and covers the period from 1 July 1925 to 30 June 1926.

Match results
Dundee United played a total of 41 matches during the 1925–26 season.

Legend

All results are written with Dundee United's score first.
Own goals in italics

First Division

Scottish Cup

References

Dundee United F.C. seasons
Dundee United